Vanxay Sinebandith (born 15 June 1969) is a Laotian sprinter. He competed in the men's 400 metres at the 1992 Summer Olympics.

References

External links
 

1969 births
Living people
Athletes (track and field) at the 1992 Summer Olympics
Laotian male sprinters
Olympic athletes of Laos
Place of birth missing (living people)
Athletes (track and field) at the 1994 Asian Games
Asian Games competitors for Laos